Kipawa is a village and municipality in western Quebec, Canada, in the Témiscamingue Regional County Municipality. It is located at the south end of Lake Kipawa, adjacent to the Kebaowek Reserve. The land including and surrounding Lake Kipawa and Kipawa Village has been inhabited for centuries. The original inhabitants are the Algonquin people. The first Europeans to come into Kipawa were fur traders and missionaries. Shortly after, The Hudson Bay Trading Company and various other lumber companies settled there, including Commonwealth Plywood.

Kipawa is a variant of the Algonquin word "Kebaowek" which refers to getting off or disembarkation, or the location where one can pick up supplies or trade.

Demographics
Population trend:
 Population in 2021: 446 (2016 to 2021 population change: -10.6%)
 Population in 2016: 499 
 Population in 2011: 474 
 Population in 2006: 565
 Population in 2001: 521
 Population in 1996: 549
 Population in 1991: 507

Private dwellings occupied by usual residents: 214 (total dwellings: 325)

Mother tongue:
 English as first language: 42.7%
 French as first language: 52.8%
 English and French as first language: 3.4%
 Other as first language: 1.1%

See also
 List of municipalities in Quebec
 Kebaowek First Nation

References

Further reading
Kermot A. Moore, Kipawa: Portrait of a People. Cobalt, Ontario: Highway Book Shop, 1982. .

External links
 

Municipalities in Quebec
Incorporated places in Abitibi-Témiscamingue
Témiscamingue Regional County Municipality